Roksana Tymchenko (born 15 June 1991) is an alpine skier from Ukraine.

Performances

External links

1991 births
Living people
Ukrainian female alpine skiers
Competitors at the 2015 Winter Universiade
21st-century Ukrainian women